Joannes "Joyjoy" Pepito Alegado is a Filipino politician from Consolacion, Cebu, Philippines. He currently serves as the mayor of Consolacion. Alegado previously served as councilor of Consolacion.

References

Living people
Year of birth missing (living people)
PDP–Laban politicians
21st-century Filipino politicians
Filipino medical doctors